Target was a popular Indian children's magazine that was published monthly in English from 1979 to 1995. It featured a mix of reader contributions, stories from regular writers, do-it-yourself articles and several popular comic strips.

History
In September 1979, Rosalind Wilson (1942 – July 28, 1992), a British expatriate educationist settled in Delhi started Target and became its founder-editor. The magazine was owned by Living Media, who also own the India Today Group. After Rosalind Wilson's death in 1992, the magazine's publication continued under Amena Jayal with its successful formula of stories and illustrations.

In 1995, in a move to target a larger age group, India Today Group wound up Target to start Teens Today magazine. This move was a failure, because, with its emphasis on fashion and urban life, Teens Today did not have the wide appeal of the unpretentious Target. Teens Today was edited by Target old-timer Vatsala Kaul.

Content
Target'''s outstanding production values as well as the quality of cartoonists and writers on its editorial board made it stand out from other contemporary Indian children's magazines like Tinkle, Champak and Chandamama.

A popular feature in Target was pages with information on international pen friends. In the age before email revolutionised communication, having pen friends was a popular hobby, both for the purpose of knowing about the world at large, and collecting stamps from foreign countries.

Some of the popular comic strips published in Target were:
 Gardhab Das by Jayanto and Neelabh
 Detective Moochhwala and Funny World by Ajit Ninan
 Granny's Gupshup by Praloy Chakrovorty and Joygopal Podder and others
 It Happened in History written by Renuka Narayanan and illustrated by Suddhasattwa Basu.
 Science News illustrated by Priya Nagarajan and others

Contributors

 Writers 
Dilip Salvi
Sigrun Srivastava
Ruskin Bond
Geeta Dharmarajan
Jacquelyn Singh
Joygopal Podder
Mala Marwaha (author and illustrator)
Margaret Bhatty
Meera Govil
Meera Uberoi
Paro Anand
Ramaa Isvaran
Renuka Narayanan
Roopa Pai
Rupa Gupta
Subhadra Sengupta
Swapna Dutta
Vijaya Ghosh (associate editor)
Viswajita Das
Vatsala Kaul (associate editor)

 Illustrators 
 Ajit Ninan (made the Funny World and All in Fun'' cartoon pages)
 Jayanto Banerjee
 Neelabh Banerjee
 Suddhasattwa Basu (creator of India's first animated cartoon series, Gayab Aya)
 Praloy Chakrovorty
 Sujata Singh
 Manjula Padmanabhan (author and illustrator)
 Priya Nagarajan
 Atanu Roy (illustrated the "HA! HA!" jokes page)

References

1979 establishments in India
1995 disestablishments in India
Defunct magazines published in India
English-language magazines published in India
Indian comics
Children's magazines published in India
Monthly magazines published in India
India Today Group
Magazines about comics
Magazines established in 1979
Magazines disestablished in 1995
Magazines published in Delhi